William Leo Jordan (December 29, 1929 – February 15, 2015) was a politician in Ontario, Canada. He was a Progressive Conservative member of the Legislative Assembly of Ontario from 1990 to 1999.

Background
Jordan studied Public Administration at Carleton University. He worked for thirty-nine years at Ontario Hydro, in the fields of operations, customer service, property and marketing. He was also a beef farmer, and served for a time as reeve of Montague Township and a member of the Lanark County council. He died on February 15, 2015.

Politics
He was elected to the Ontario legislature in the 1990 provincial election, defeating Liberal Guin Persaud by about 1,500 votes in the riding of Lanark—Renfrew.  This election was won by the Ontario New Democratic Party, and Jordan sat on the opposition benches for the next five years.

The PC party won the 1995 provincial election, in which Jordan defeated his Liberal opponent by more than 10,000 votes.  In 1997 he was appointed as Parliamentary Assistant to the Minister of Economic Development, Trade and Tourism.

In 1996, the Harris government reduced the number of provincial ridings from 130 to 103. This meant that a number of sitting Members of Provincial Parliament MPPs had to compete against one another for re-election. Jordan ran against veteran Liberal MPP Sean Conway in the new riding of Renfrew—Nipissing—Pembroke in the 1999 provincial election, and lost by almost 6,000 votes.

In 2000, Jordan sought the federal Canadian Alliance nomination in Lanark—Carleton, but lost to Scott Reid.

Personal life 
His son John Jordan was elected MPP for Lanark—Frontenac—Kingston in the 2022 provincial election.

Electoral record (partial)

References

External links

2015 deaths
Carleton University alumni
Progressive Conservative Party of Ontario MPPs
1929 births
People from Almonte, Ontario